Worth It is a 1996 Mandarin language studio album by Cantopop singer Sammi Cheng. It was Cheng's first Mandarin album, surpassing her previous two Cantonese albums within the first three weeks in the stores and debuting at No.1 on the Taiwan album chart, where it remained for six consecutive weeks. Music videos were made for three singles: Zhídé (Worth It), "Bèipàn" (Betrayal) and "Yīkào" (Reliance).

Track listing
Zhídé 值得
bèipàn 背叛
xiāngféng bù hèn wǎn 相逢不恨晚
wéi xūn 微醺
jiù xiàngliàn 舊項鏈
céng shì nǐ de bǎobèi 曾是你的寶貝
wúsuǒwèi 無所謂
xiǎoxīn nǚrén (huī gūniáng) 小心女人 (Cinderella)
yīkào 依靠
zhànlǐng 佔領
yíngfēng 迎風
cuìruò 脆弱

References

1996 albums
Sammi Cheng albums